Christopher Atkinson (c. 1738 – 23 April 1819), from about 1798 known as Christopher Atkinson Savile or Saville, was an English merchant and politician.

Born in Yorkshire, Atkinson moved to London and married the niece of a corn merchant, entering that trade himself. At the 1780 general election Atkinson was elected as one of the two Members of Parliament for Hedon, but he was expelled from the House of Commons on 4 December 1783,
after being convicted of perjury, and was sentenced to stand in the pillory.

Atkinson was granted a royal pardon in 1791, and was again returned to Parliament for Hedon in 1796, holding the seat until he stood down at the 1806 general election.  He changed his name to Saville some time after 1798.

He then bought extensive properties in Okehampton in Devon, which gave him control of both parliamentary seats of the pocket borough of Okehampton, and at the election of 1807 he returned his son Albany Savile (1783-1831). He returned himself for Okehampton at the 1818 election, holding  the seat until his death in April 1819, aged over eighty.

Marriages and children 
Atkinson’s first wife was Jane Constable, a daughter of John Constable and the aunt of the painter John Constable.

His second wife was Jane Savile, a daughter of John Savile (1712-1778). Their only son, Albany Savile, was the grandfather of Sir Leopold Halliday Savile. Albany was one of the members of parliament for the family’s borough of Okehampton between 1807 and 1820, briefly serving alongside his father as the borough’s other member. 

Savile had an illegitimate son called Robert Farrand who was one of the Members for Hedon in 1818–1820 and later a Member for Stafford in 1837.

Relationship with John Constable 
In his diary, Joseph Farington describes a dinner with John Constable in 1811 at which Savile was discussed:

References 
 

Year of birth uncertain
1730s births
1819 deaths
18th-century English businesspeople
19th-century English landowners
Businesspeople from Yorkshire
Members of the Parliament of Great Britain for Hedon
Members of the Parliament of the United Kingdom for Hedon
Members of the Parliament of the United Kingdom for Okehampton
British MPs 1780–1784
British MPs 1796–1800
UK MPs 1801–1802
UK MPs 1802–1806
UK MPs 1818–1820
English perjurers
Recipients of British royal pardons
Expelled members of the Parliament of Great Britain